Namit Khanna (born 29 October 1985) is an Indian actor known for portraying Siddhant Sinha in Yeh Pyaar Nahi Toh Kya Hai and Dr. Siddhant "Sid" Mathur in Sanjivani.

Early life
Khanna hails from Delhi. He completed his Bachelor of Business Administration from Kingston University, London. He started his modelling career in 2004.

After modelling for almost a decade, he decided to retire from it.

Career
Khanna made his acting debut in 2017 with Vikram Bhatt's Twisted as Ranbir Raichand opposite Nia Sharma.

In 2018, he made his television debut with Sony TV's Yeh Pyaar Nahi Toh Kya Hai as Siddhant Sinha opposite Palak Jain.

From 2019 to 2020, he portrayed Dr. Siddhant "Sid" Mathur in Star Plus's Sanjivani

In December 2021, he made his debut in music videos through music video titled Butterfly opposite Anupamaa actress Madalsa Sharma Chakraborty(sung by Dev Negi and Swati Sharma).

Media
Khanna was listed 17th in Times of India's list of Top 20 Most Desirable Men on Indian Television 2019.

In 2019, he was placed 28th in Eastern Eyes Top 50 Sexiest Asian Men List. He was also ranked 19th in Biz Asias TV Personality List 2019. He ranked 10th in Biz Asias TV Personality List 2020.

Filmography

Television

Web

Music Videos

References

External links
 
 
 

Indian male television actors
Living people
Indian male film actors
1985 births